Abutbul is a surname. People with this surname include:

 Alon Abutbul (born 1965), Israeli actor, announcer, and film producer
 Asi Abutbul (born 1975), Israeli mafia boss
 Shay Abutbul (born 1983), Israeli footballer

See also
 Jewish name, paragraph about Oriental Jewish names
Other variations of the name:
 Abitbol
 Abiteboul
 Botbol, with a comprehensive etymology

References 

Maghrebi Jewish surnames
Surnames of Moroccan origin